Paiga is a village situated in Block- Damkhoda, Tehsil- Baheri, District- Bareilly , Uttar Pradesh, India.

References 

Villages in Bareilly district